Powerful Robot Games was a game development studio based in Montevideo, Uruguay. It was founded in 2002 by game researcher Gonzalo Frasca and Sofía Battegazzore. It closed down ten years later in 2012.

The studio developed Big Fat Awesome House Party, a web game for Cartoon Network that generated over 13 million accounts in its first year.

The studio also developed BEST. GAME. EVER.-a browser game made for Total Drama Island

The studio also developed Path of the Jedi—a browser game made for Star Wars: The Clone Wars in 2009.

Powerful Robot pioneered the field of campaign games by developing in 2003, along with Persuasive Games, the first videogame ever commissioned for a U.S. Presidential campaign. Its team was also behind "Cambiemos" (2004), a game for the Uruguayan Presidential Campaign.

References

External links
 Powerful Robot
 Cartoon Network's Big Fat Awesome House Party

Video game development companies
Defunct companies of Uruguay